Haig Housing is a charity founded in 1928 to provide housing for ex-servicemen in the United Kingdom and the Channel Islands.

Haig Homes is the leading UK provider of rental housing for ex-service people.
Haig Homes has access to over 1,300 properties situated on small, well-managed estates ranging in size from about six houses up to the largest estate in Morden of over 270 homes. The properties, a mix of family-sized houses, maisonettes and flats, are, including the properties managed by its sister charity Haig Housing Trust, spread throughout the United Kingdom in 47 different local authorities. The properties are for rental only.
Haig Homes does not have any sheltered, residential or nursing homes. The majority of homes are suitable for families and only a small number of properties are available for a single occupancy at Bristol, Haslemere (Hampshire), Morden and Woolwich (London). Some properties are suitable for the frail, elderly and people with disabilities. Specific tailor-made housing for service and ex-service people with disabilities are possible through Haig Housing Trust. Haig Homes is a general needs charitable housing association.

Douglas Haig Memorial Homes, now known as Haig Homes, was established as a charitable trust in 1929 as a memorial to Field Marshal Earl Haig of Bemersyde KT GCB OM GCVO KCIE in recognition of his work to highlight and solve many problems facing ex-service people and their families. He was particularly concerned with the plight of those disabled during their service in theatres of war and the difficulties created by this in their civilian lives.

See also
 Haig Fund
 Coming Home campaign

References

British veterans' organisations